Vasily Aleksandrovich Potto (1 January 1836 – 29 November 1911) was a Russian lieutenant-general (1907) and military historian, known for his landmark works on the history of the Caucasian War.

History 
Born of a noble family of a German descent in the Tula Governorate, Potto was educated at the Orlovsky Bakhtin Cadet Corps. He served as a captain in the Crimean War (1853–55) and took part in putting down the Polish January Uprising (1863–64). In 1887 Colonel Potto was attached to the staff of the Caucasus Military District, where he was appointed head of the military and historical department in 1899. During his tenure in the Caucasus, Potto collected pieces of folk literature of the Caucasian mountain peoples and the Cossacks. He exploited his access to vast historical and first-hand material and produced a series of works pertaining to the Russian conquest of the Caucasus, including his monumental five-volume The Caucasian War in Different Essays, Episodes, Legends, and Biographies (1885–91).

References 

1836 births
1911 deaths
People from Tula Governorate
People from the Russian Empire of German descent
Russian nobility
Imperial Russian Army generals
Russian military historians
Russian military personnel of the Crimean War
Russian people of the January Uprising
Caucasian War